Reformasi is both a Malay and Indonesian word for reform or reformation. It may refer to the:

Reformasi (Indonesia), a movement to dethrone Suharto as President in May 1998 and the post-Suharto era in Indonesia that began immediately after.
Reformasi (Malaysia), which was initiated in September 1998 by former Malaysian Deputy Prime Minister Anwar Ibrahim, immediately after he was sacked by former Prime Minister Mahathir Mohamad.